The 1985 State of the Union Address was given by the 40th president of the United States, Ronald Reagan, on February 6, 1985 — Reagan’s 74th birthday — at 9:00 p.m. EST, in the chamber of the United States House of Representatives to the 99th United States Congress. It was Reagan's fourth State of the Union Address and his fifth speech to a joint session of the United States Congress. Presiding over this joint session was the House speaker, Tip O'Neill, accompanied by George H. W. Bush, the vice president.

He stated, "Our progress began not in Washington, DC, but in the hearts of our families, communities, workplaces, and voluntary groups which, together, are unleashing the invincible spirit of one great nation under God." He believed that volunteerism was a key element to the American community.

The president proclaimed the Reagan Doctrine, announcing support for military and other aid to forces fighting to overthrow governments in select countries around the world, and specifically for armed groups fighting to overthrow the Central American government of Nicaragua, claiming that "support for freedom fighters is self-defense." He also spoke of the plans to develop a weapons program referred to as the Strategic Defense Initiative.

The speech lasted approximately 40 minutes and consisted of 4,955 words. The address was broadcast live on radio and television.

After the joint session was dissolved, House Minority Leader Robert H. Michel led the members of the House of Representatives and Senate in singing Happy Birthday to President Reagan.

The Democratic Party response was delivered by Governor Bill Clinton of Arkansas (who himself later became president in 1993),  Governor Bob Graham of Florida and House Speaker Tip O'Neill.

Malcolm Baldrige, the Secretary of Commerce, served as the designated survivor.

See also
 Speeches and debates of Ronald Reagan
 1984 United States presidential election

References

External links

 (full transcript), The American Presidency Project, UC Santa Barbara.
 Full video and audio, Miller Center of Public Affairs, University of Virginia.
 1985 State of the Union Address (video) at C-SPAN

State of the Union addresses
State union 1985
99th United States Congress
State of the Union Address
State of the Union Address
State of the Union Address
February 1985 events in the United States
Articles containing video clips